İbrahim Yalçınkaya (born 1941) is a Turkish footballer. He competed in the tournament at the 1960 Summer Olympics.

References

External links
 

1941 births
Living people
Turkish footballers
Olympic footballers of Turkey
Footballers at the 1960 Summer Olympics
Footballers from Istanbul
Association football forwards